Storozhenskiy Light, also known as Storozhno Light, is an active lighthouse in Lake Ladoga, in the Leningrad Oblast, Russia.

At a height of  it is the seventh-tallest "traditional lighthouse" in the world, and the fourth-tallest stone lighthouse. It is a twin of the slightly shorter Osinovetsky Light.

The site is accessible and the tower is open by arrangement with the keeper.

See also

 List of lighthouses in Russia
 List of tallest lighthouses in the world

References

Lighthouses completed in 1907
Lighthouses in Russia
Buildings and structures in Leningrad Oblast
Transport in Leningrad Oblast